"Get behind me, Satan", or "Go away, Satan", and in older translations such as the King James Version "Get thee behind me, Satan", is a saying of Jesus in the New Testament.

See also
 Vade retro satana

References

Sayings of Jesus
Satan in Bible verses
Saint Peter